The Governor's Lady is a surviving 1915 American drama silent film directed by George Melford and written by William C. deMille based on the 1912 play The Governor's Lady by Alice Bradley.

The film stars May Allison, Edith Wynne Matthison, James Neill, Theodore Roberts and Tom Forman. The film was released on March 14, 1915, by Paramount Pictures.

Plot
A simple miner named Daniel Slade and his wife Mary live in the mountains. Mary has a miscarriage and shortly after that Daniel discovers gold. The new wealth divides them; Daniel wants to join high society but Mary wants to continue living the simple life. Daniel gets frustrated and considers marrying Katherine Strickland, but in the end he realizes he loves Mary and follows her back to the cabin. By this time he has entered politics as a governor and he persuades her to return to be the governor's lady.

Cast
May Allison as Katherine Strickland
Edith Wynne Matthison 
James Neill as Daniel Slade
Theodore Roberts as Senator Strickland
Tom Forman as Robert Hayes

Preservation status
A print is preserved in the Library of Congress collection Packard Campus.

References

External links

 The Governor's Lady, 1915, herald

1910s English-language films
Silent American drama films
1915 drama films
Paramount Pictures films
American black-and-white films
American silent feature films
Films directed by George Melford
American films based on plays
1910s American films